Kelcie Jerome McCray (born September 21, 1988) is an American football strong safety who is currently a free agent. He was signed by the Miami Dolphins as an undrafted free agent in 2012. He played college football at Arkansas State.

McCray has also played for the Tampa Bay Buccaneers, Kansas City Chiefs, Seattle Seahawks, and Buffalo Bills.

Professional career

Miami Dolphins
On May 2, 2012, McCray signed with the Miami Dolphins as an undrafted free agent. On July 31, 2012, he had scheduled surgery on his broken foot. On August 26, 2012, he was placed on Injured reserve due to a broken foot, causing him to miss the entire 2012 NFL season.

Tampa Bay Buccaneers
On October 2, 2013, he was claimed off waivers by the Tampa Bay Buccaneers.

Kansas City Chiefs
On August 21, 2014, McCray was traded to the Kansas City Chiefs for guard Rishaw Johnson. On March 13, 2015, he re-signed with the Chiefs.

Seattle Seahawks
On September 5, 2015, McCray was traded to the Seattle Seahawks for a fifth round draft pick. With the trade McCray joined the defensive unit nicknamed the Legion of Boom.

In Week 12 vs the 8-3 Vikings, he had 5 special team tackles. In Week 15 against the Cleveland Browns, McCray played his first game as a starter for the Seattle Seahawks, as teammate Kam Chancellor was injured. He recorded 8 tackles and 1 pass defended.

McCray would start again in Week 16 against the St. Louis Rams, and again in Week 17 at the Arizona Cardinals, recording 10 tackles and 1 pass defended against the Rams, and 3 tackles against the Cardinals. He finished his first season with the Seahawks with 36 tackles and 2 pass deflections.

Buffalo Bills
On January 17, 2018, McCray signed a reserve/future contract with the Buffalo Bills. He was released on September 1, 2018.

References

External links
Seattle Seahawks bio
Kansas City Chiefs bio
Tampa Bay Buccaneers bio
Miami Dolphins bio
Arkansas State bio

1988 births
Living people
Players of American football from Columbus, Georgia
American football safeties
Arkansas State Red Wolves football players
Miami Dolphins players
Tampa Bay Buccaneers players
Kansas City Chiefs players
Seattle Seahawks players
Buffalo Bills players